The executive offices of the executive branch of the government of Puerto Rico comprise the offices ascribed directly to the Office of the Governor of Puerto Rico and whose presiding officers are appointed directly by the Governor without the advice and consent of the Senate or any other body. The offices are charged with the tasks, functions, or program areas delegated to it by the Governor or the Chief of Staff, not contrary to any specific provision of Puerto Rican law or the Constitution of Puerto Rico.

Offices

References

Office of the Governor of Puerto Rico